The Prix des libraires (Booksellers award) is a French literary award that is given to the author of a novel written in French. The award is organized since 1955 by the Fédération Française Syndicale de la librairie (FFSL). Approximately 5000 booksellers from France, Belgium, Switzerland and Canada cast a vote.

Award winners

References

External links 
 Le Prix des Libraires website

 
French literary awards
Awards established in 1955
1955 establishments in France